The New Poetry is a poetry anthology edited by Al Alvarez, published in 1962 and in a revised edition in 1966. It was greeted at the time as a significant review of the post-war scene in English poetry.

The introduction, written by Alvarez, is an essay called The New Poetry or Beyond the Gentility Principle. It originally appeared in a magazine called Commentary (not to be confused with the better-known New-York-based monthly of the same name) as a survey describing the state of modern poetry as Alvarez saw it. It made much play of contrasts between British/American poetry, old and then contemporary poetry, and for example Brits like Philip Larkin versus Ted Hughes.

The criteria for inclusion in The New Poetry were these: the poets had to be British (which excluded Sylvia Plath from the first edition); they needed to have been young enough to have made their reputations only after 1950 (this excluded the likes of W. H. Auden and Louis MacNeice); and they had to appeal to Alvarez himself. There were two exceptions to the first and second of these guidelines: Alvarez included long well-established Americans Robert Lowell and John Berryman at the start of the anthology. Alvarez concluded that Lowell and Berryman were the most influential figures on British poetry writing at that time, which justified their inclusion. Each poet was represented with a minimum of five poems. In the revised edition (1966) Alvarez relaxed these rules somewhat to allow Plath and yet another American poet, Anne Sexton, to be represented. In some senses the anthology can be seen as a reaction to Robert Conquest's New Lines anthology, which appeared a decade before.

The anthology included a very brief biographical note on each of the poets. The revised edition included three poems by Sylvia Plath that were previously unpublished.

Poets in The New Poetry, 1966 edition

Kingsley Amis
John Berryman
Arthur Boyars
Iain Crichton Smith
Donald Davie
D. J. Enright
John Fuller
Thom Gunn
Michael Hamburger
Ian Hamilton

Geoffrey Hill
David Holbrook
Ted Hughes
Philip Larkin
Robert Lowell
George MacBeth
Norman MacCaig
Christopher Middleton
Sylvia Plath

Peter Porter
Peter Redgrove
Anne Sexton
Jon Silkin
R. S. Thomas
Charles Tomlinson
John Wain
Ted Walker
David Wevill

See also
 1962 in poetry
 1962 in literature
 1966 in poetry
 1966 in literature
 20th century in literature
 20th century in poetry
 English literature
 List of poetry anthologies

References
 Poetry Daily website

1962 poetry books
1966 poetry books
British poetry anthologies